Sir Percival Hartley CBE MC  FRS (28 May 1881 – 16 February 1957) was an English immunologist who was head of the Medical Research Council (MRC) Biological Standards Division for 44 years.

Early life
Harvey was born at Calverley, Yorkshire, England, the son of William Thompson Hartley, a coal merchant. He attended Bradford Technical College and then the University of Leeds where he qualified BSc in 1905. He then won a scholarship to the Lister Institute of Preventive Medicine in London from 1906 to 1908. He gained a Doctor of Science degree from the University of London in 1909.

Career
Hartley worked in India for four years then returned to the Lister Institute in 1913 but joined up with the Royal Army Medical Corps (RAMC) and served as a captain from 1915 to 1919 during the First World War. He won the Military Cross in 1917.

Hartley then worked for three years at the Wellcome Physiological Research Laboratories and in 1922 joined the National Institute for Medical Research where he became director of biological samples. He stayed till 1946 when he joined the London School of Hygiene & Tropical Medicine. He worked at the Sir William Dunn School of Pathology from 1949 to 1953 and at the Lister Institute again from 1949 to 1953. In the 1940s he worked with Ralph Kekwick.

Awards and honours
He was awarded the CBE in 1922 and elected a Fellow of the Royal Society in 1937. He was knighted in 1944 for work on penicillin.

Personal life
He married Olga Parnell (d.1950) in 1920 and they had two daughters. He died in London.

References

Fellows of the Royal Society
Commanders of the Order of the British Empire
Recipients of the Military Cross
Knights Bachelor
Alumni of the University of Leeds
1881 births
1957 deaths
People from Calverley
British immunologists